Lionel Braham (April 1, 1879 – October 6, 1947) was a British actor. He appeared in the films Snow White, Young Lochinvar, I'll Show You the Town, Skinner's Dress Suit, Don Juan, As You Like It, Personal Property, The Prince and the Pauper, Wee Willie Winkie, Lord Jeff, A Christmas Carol, The Little Princess, I Dood It, The Song of Bernadette and Macbeth, among others.

Braham also played the role of Caliban in Percy MacKaye's production of the civic masque, Caliban by the Yellow Sands.

Filmography

References

External links
 
  Androcles and the Lion(City Museum of New York)
  portraits of Lionel Braham(NYPublic Library, Billy Rose)

1879 births
1947 deaths
20th-century English male actors
English male film actors